Nicolas Fuss (29 January 1755 – 4 January 1826), also known as Nikolai Fuss, was a Swiss mathematician, living most of his life in Imperial Russia.

Biography
Fuss was born in Basel, Switzerland.  He moved to Saint Petersburg to serve as a mathematical assistant to Leonhard Euler from 1773–1783, and remained there until his death.  He contributed to spherical trigonometry, differential equations, the optics of microscopes and telescopes, differential geometry, and actuarial science. He also contributed to Euclidean geometry, including the problem of Apollonius.

In 1797, he was elected a foreign member of the Royal Swedish Academy of Sciences. From 1800–1826, Fuss served as the permanent secretary to the Imperial Academy of Sciences in Saint Petersburg. He was elected a Foreign Honorary Member of the American Academy of Arts and Sciences in 1812. He died in Saint Petersburg.

Family 
Nicolas Fuss was married to Albertine Benedikte Philippine Luise Euler (1766-1822). Albertine Euler was the daughter of Leonhard Euler's eldest son Johann Albrecht Euler (1734-1800) and his wife Anna Sophie Charlotte Hagemeister.  Pauline Fuss, a daughter of Nicolas and Albertine, married Russian chemist Genrikh Struve. Nicolas's son Paul Heinrich Fuss (1798-1855) edited the first attempt at a collected works of Euler. Paul Heinrich was a member of the Imperial Academy of Sciences in Saint Petersburg from 1823 and its secretary from 1826. Nicolas's son Georg Albert 1806–54), was from 1839 an astronomer in Pulowa and then from 1848 in Vilnius and also published on magnetism.

See also
 Catenary
 Fuss' theorem for bicentric quadrilaterals
 Fuss–Catalan number

References

 , 2006

External links
 MacTutor History of Mathematics
 

1755 births
1826 deaths
18th-century Swiss mathematicians
Members of the Royal Swedish Academy of Sciences
Fellows of the American Academy of Arts and Sciences
Full members of the Saint Petersburg Academy of Sciences
Swiss expatriates in Russia
Russian people of Swiss descent
19th-century Swiss mathematicians
18th-century mathematicians from the Russian Empire
19th-century mathematicians from the Russian Empire
Members of the Royal Society of Sciences in Uppsala